The 2023 Mid-Season Invitational is the upcoming eighth Mid-Season Invitational (MSI), a Riot Gamesorganised tournament for League of Legends, a multiplayer online battle arena video game. The tournament would be the culmination of the 2023 Spring Split and the first interregional competition of Season 13.

Four of the nine premier League of Legends leagues had two teams representing them, including the LCK, LPL, LEC and LCS. The number of teams taking part in this tournament would be increased from eleven to thirteen. The event also marked the first time a double elimination format would be applied to a League of Legends esports event, as the event will be split into two stages, that being the play-in stage and the bracket stage.

The tournament would be hosted in London, United Kingdom, from 2 to 21 May 2023. All stages of the tournament will be played in the Copper Box Arena.

Royal Never Give Up from China are the two-time defending champions.

Format 
8 of the 13 teams would start from the play-in stage. Three final surviving teams from the play-in stage would then proceed to the bracket stage, where they would meet with the other five teams.

Play-in stage 
All teams would be drawn into two groups, with all groups having four teams. Excluding the Last Chance Qualifier (LCQ) match that is a best-of five match, all the other matches of the stage will have a best-of-three double elimination format.

Bracket stage 
The three surviving teams from previous stage would join the other five teams to compete in the bracket stage. All matches of the bracket stage will have a best-of-five double elimination format.

Qualified teams

Roster 
 Player did not play any games.

Venue 
London was the city chosen to host the competition. Both Play-In Stage and Bracket Stage would be held at the Copper Box Arena.

Play-in stage 

 Date and time: 2–7 May, begins at 13:00 GMT on weekdays and 12:00 GMT on weekends
 Eight teams would be drawn into two groups
 Double elimination; all matches are best-of-three
 Three surviving teams advanced to the Bracket Stage; five teams would be eliminated

Group A

Round 1 

 Date: 

 Date:

Round 2 

 Date:

Lower round 1 

 Date:

Lower round 2 

 Date:

Group B

Round 1 

 Date: 

 Date:

Round 2 

 Date:

Lower round 1 

 Date:

Lower round 2 

 Date:

Lower bracket final match

Match 1 

 Date:

Bracket stage 

 Date and time: 10–21 May, begins at 13:00 GMT on weekdays and 12:00 GMT on weekends
 Double elimination; matches are best-of-five

Round 1 

 Date: 

 Date: 

 Date: 

 Date:

Round 2 
 Date: 

 Date:

Lower round 1 

 Date: 

 Date:

Lower round 2 

 Date: 

 Date:

Lower round 3 

 Date:

Lower round 4 

 Date:

Finals 

 Date: 21 May
 The members of the winning team will lift the MSI trophy, earning their title as the League of Legends 2023 Mid-Season Invitational Champions.

Ranking

Team ranking

Notes

References 

Mid-Season Invitational, 2023
2023